The canton of Roquebrune-sur-Argens is an administrative division of the Var department, southeastern France. It was created at the French canton reorganisation which came into effect in March 2015. Its seat is in Roquebrune-sur-Argens.

It consists of the following communes:

Bagnols-en-Forêt
Callian
Fayence
Mons
Montauroux
Puget-sur-Argens
Roquebrune-sur-Argens
Saint-Paul-en-Forêt
Seillans
Tanneron
Tourrettes

References

Cantons of Var (department)